Dicrocerus elegans (Its name is Greek for "fork antler") is an extinct species of deer found in France, Europe (related species in Asia). Dicrocerus probably came from Asia, from the region where true deer are believed to have originated and evolved. It inhabited forests in the temperate belt and in Europe it was typical of the Miocene (15-5 million years ago). It died out at the beginning of Pliocene without leaving any descendants.

Description 
Its long skull sported a set of antlers with a thickened base - the first known member of cervids to possess them. The antlers were still quite primitive and had no tines; they were worn only by the males. Like modern deer, Dicrocerus shed its antlers every year. The main stem was shorter in each new set. The same is seen in modern muntjacs.

Gallery

References 

 Benes, Josef. Prehistoric Animals and Plants. Pg. 240. Prague: Artua, 1979.

Prehistoric deer
Miocene mammals of Europe
Prehistoric even-toed ungulate genera
Miocene even-toed ungulates
Fossil taxa described in 1837
Mammals described in 1837